Ortacesus is a comune (municipality) in the Province of South Sardinia in the Italian region Sardinia, located about  north of Cagliari, included in the Trexenta traditional subregion.

Ortacesus borders the following municipalities: Barrali, Guamaggiore, Guasila, Pimentel, Sant'Andrea Frius, Selegas, Senorbì.

References 

Cities and towns in Sardinia